Bruce Edward Bursten (March 8, 1954) is an American chemist, professor of chemistry, and was president of the American Chemical Society. He is provost at Worcester Polytechnic Institute. His research has specialised in inorganic chemistry and metal-containing molecules.

Life 
He was born in Chicago, Illinois. He graduated from University of Chicago, and University of Wisconsin-Madison, where he studied with Richard F. Fenske.

He taught at Ohio State University, University of Tennessee, Knoxville, and Barnard College. 
He was AAAS Chemistry Chair and an ACS fellow.

References

Sources 

1954 births
Living people
Scientists from Chicago
University of Chicago alumni
University of Wisconsin–Madison alumni
Worcester Polytechnic Institute faculty
Presidents of the American Chemical Society
21st-century American chemists